Nicholas Alahverdian (born July 11, 1987), also known as Nicholas Rossi and Arthur Knight, among other aliases, is an American sex offender who faked his own death in 2020.

Alahverdian alleged that he suffered abuse and negligence in the Department of Children Youth and Families (DCYF), Rhode Island's social service system. In support of this allegation, he unsuccessfully sued the DCYF in federal court in 2011, then voluntarily dismissed the lawsuit when Rhode Island waived his medical expenses debt of around $200,000.

In January 2020, Alahverdian said that he had been diagnosed with non-Hodgkin lymphoma. In February 2020, news outlets reported Alahverdian's death, citing his family's anonymous testimony and his obituary. The reports of his death were disputed, as they occurred after the FBI initiated a fraud investigation against him, while Rhode Island police had a warrant on him for failure to register as a sex offender.

In October 2021, he was discovered in a hospital in Scotland, while undergoing treatment for COVID-19. He was arrested in December on charges of an alleged rape in Utah in 2008 (a sealed arrest warrant had been issued in September 2020), in addition to other alleged crimes. Efforts are underway to extradite him to the United States. In November 2022, Edinburgh Sheriff Court confirmed that the arrested man was Nicholas Rossi, despite his claims of mistaken identity.

Biography 

Alahverdian alleged his parents were "abusive and alcoholic" and "couldn't take care of him" leading to his placement in the care of the DCYF.

Early in his life, he was diagnosed with behavioral and mental health issues. His stepfather David Rossi stated: "He just wouldn’t listen in school, he hit the mother, hit the grandmother all the time, hit his siblings. I used to have to hold him down, and he'd be spitting at me" and as a result, he was placed in psychiatric care at Butler Hospital and later, Bradley Hospital. There, doctors diagnosed him with narcissistic personality disorder and attention deficit disorder. After being discharged from a treatment program, he briefly went back to his family home but was removed and placed into the care of DCYF as a result of creating conflict within his family home.
Alahverdian has alleged that for a period of 15 months beginning in March 2002 the DCYF placed him in their "night-to-night" program, in which a youth would spend his or her days at a DCYF building in Pawtucket and nights at one of several shelters around Rhode Island, including locations in Central Falls, Providence, Narragansett, or Woonsocket. Alahverdian said he did not attend school during this period. According to Alahverdian, the other youths stole his belongings and threatened and assaulted him during this period.  The Providence Journal, in April 2012, described the night-to-night program as a "stifling" experience and said Alahverdian was "denied a substantial chunk of his childhood".

Alahverdian was hired as a legislative page in the Rhode Island House of Representatives at age 14.  Alahverdian said that he informed lawmakers about his negative experience in DCYF care, but received no assistance. Brian G. Coogan, a Rhode Island Representative at the time, stated that he felt sorry for the teenage Alahverdian and took action to formally adopt him, but was warned off from doing so by Family Court Chief Judge Jeremiah S. Jeremiah. Coogan said that Jeremiah predicted that Alahverdian "will try to undermine you and turn your family upside-down".

Alahverdian claims to have formed NexusGovernment, an organization to lobby for child welfare, in 2002, at the age of 15. However, Alahverdian said that he quit the organization in March 2003. Additionally, The Providence Journal, reporting in 2011, stated that NexusGovernment was only "recently formed".

Local media reported that Alahverdian was sent by DCYF to Boys Town in Nebraska and Manatee Palms Youth Services in Florida in 2003. In a 2011 lawsuit filed against the Rhode Island DCYF, he testified that he was prohibited from contacting others, such as the media, attorneys, the state child advocate and his caseworker during this period. Alahverdian alleged that he was sent out of state because, in Rhode Island, he was "a source of information on DCYF". Rhode Island authorities stated that there were no records of Alahverdian being abused.

According to a DCYF spokesperson, they stopped using Manatee Palms Youth Services in 2005 due to "concerns we had with the way they were treating our kids". In 2005, Alahverdian was returned to Rhode Island, where he received treatment at Bradley Hospital for a two-week period. Afterwards, he was placed in an independent living program.

Alahverdian told WPRI that he was beaten daily in Florida, Nebraska and Rhode Island by other youths in DCYF programs. Alahverdian told WJAR that he suffered "torture, beatings, assault" and neglect under DCYF care until 2005.

For a short period of time, Alahverdian studied comparative literature in extension program classes offered by Harvard University. He did not graduate, as in 2012, he was "administratively withdrawn" from the course when the university learned of his sex offender status. Despite this, Alahverdian claimed to be a "Harvard scholar, political scientist and sociologist".

After Alahverdian failed to overturn his sex offender conviction, "he became a men's rights figurehead for radicalized people" who claim they are unable to get romantic or sexual partners despite desiring them, often referred to as incels.

In 2017, Alahverdian lived with a friend in Providence, Rhode Island. The friend later applied for a restraining order against Alahverdian, accusing Alahverdian of refusing to move out and cashing checks belonging to the friend.

Alahverdian eventually left the United States, settling in South Bristol, England with a woman called Miranda Knight. According to Miranda's brother, Alahverdian dated Miranda in 2019, and they married in early 2020. None of Alahverdian's family or friends were present at the ceremony. Alahverdian never spoke about his family, and told Miranda he was from Dublin and was working in online marketing and public relations, said Miranda's brother. In February 2020, Alahverdian faked his death to American media.

In 2021, Alahverdian and Miranda moved to Glasgow, Scotland. There, he claimed to be a professor teaching at the nearby University of Glasgow. According to a neighbour in Glasgow, Alahverdian said he was "creating a textbook on religious education for schools", used an English accent, had blonde hair and a blonde moustache, and in the neighbour's opinion, for "someone who was on the run he really liked to draw attention to himself".

Child welfare advocacy 
In March 2011, after meeting Alahverdian, state representative Roberto DaSilva submitted a proposal to further restrict DCYF from using facilities outside of Rhode Island; the proposal was also a cost-cutting measure. DaSilva credited Alahverdian's story as inspiration for his proposed legislation. The proposed legislation failed, so DaSilva re-submitted the proposal in January 2012 and it was given a hearing the following month, but shelved for "further study" in mid-March.

In February 2020, Rhode Island state representatives Ray Hull, John J. Lombardi, David Bennett, and James N. McLaughlin proposed an "Emergency Oversight Commission" to monitor DCYF, as advocated by Alahverdian. According to WPRI's reporting, if the legislation passed, nine state representatives would form a commission to investigate "unconstitutional or unethical procedures at DCYF that put children in harm's way", with a report to be published in May 2021. Hull's proposed legislation wasn't voted upon and died in committee. Hull later said that Alahverdian had continually pressed him to introduce this legislation before faking his death, describing the process as being that Alahverdian would "just beat you down".

Former Rhode Island state representatives spoke in 2022 about their past experiences with Alahverdian. Brian G. Coogan described Alahverdian as "brilliant" but "dangerous", accusing Alahverdian of having "swindled a lot of people", by persuading some Rhode Island lawmakers to give him money, sometimes via threats of accusing them of rape and assault. Joanne Giannini said that Alahverdian continually asked her for money. After initially acceding to his requests, Giannini eventually told him to "get a job". This resulted in Alahverdian saying "so many horrible things" to her, "He knew how to hurt you with words. The whole thing really bothered me."

Lawsuit against the DCYF 
In February 2011, Alahverdian initiated a federal lawsuit against the Department of Children Youth and Families (DCYF), the states of Florida and Nebraska, six residential facilities, and 18 individuals, for alleged abuse committed against him. Among the individuals sued were Rhode Island Governor Donald Carcieri and Family Court Chief Judge Jeremiah S. Jeremiah.

In August 2013, the federal lawsuit was settled by the parties, in exchange for Rhode Island waiving a more than $200,000 lien that was placed on any settlement proceeds from the lawsuit. The lien was for medical expenses incurred while he was in state foster care. The lawsuit concluded with the DCYF expressly denying any "liability or culpability regarding the allegations" according to the DCYF's deputy director Kevin Aucoin. Alahverdian acknowledged that he had released the state of Rhode Island and its government employees from liability. The court itself did not reveal details of the settlement. Alahverdian also agreed to dismiss two other lawsuits he had filed, one which accused DCYF of violating a confidentiality agreement, and another against state sheriffs.

Personal legal issues

2008 sexual imposition conviction 
According to a Sinclair Community College student, in January 2008, she met Alahverdian on campus in Ohio and had lunch with him, after which he offered to walk with her to her next class; then in a basement stairwell, he "pinned" her against a wall, groped her and masturbated himself. When she protested, he said: "I'm almost done. Don't be a bitch". She also said that Alahverdian later apologized and told her "he couldn't help it" because she was "so beautiful — and not to tell anybody." She made a police report.

Later in 2008, Alahverdian, under the name Nicholas Rossi, was convicted of public indecency and sexual imposition for the above incident, and was required to register as a sex offender. He filed a motion for a retrial based on a newly surfaced Myspace post allegedly written by the victim, which claimed that she had lied about the incident. At an evidentiary hearing on February 28, 2011, a computer forensics expert testified "with 90% certainty" that the post had been altered or fabricated entirely. The motion for retrial was dismissed by the reviewing judge.

In April 2013, he tried to sue Sinclair Community College, Dayton Municipal Court, and multiple others in the Southern Ohio United States District Court for making "serious, life-altering false allegations" and claimed he was deprived of a jury trial. This suit was dismissed by judge Thomas M. Rose on August 12, 2013.

Alahverdian also sued his victim, accusing her of libel as she had described him as "crazy". The result of that court case came in 2014, where Alahverdian's claim was found to be without merit. Also that year, Alahverdian wrote an essay, My Personal 9/11, in which he named and blamed his victim for ruining his "goals and aspirations", comparing the victim's actions to the September 11 attacks.

2010 no contest of domestic assault 

On November 11, 2010, according to a police report of the incident: police visited Alahverdian's Sayles Avenue flat in Rhode Island, after being alerted by a friend of a woman. While outside the flat, the police heard screaming from a woman and a man. The woman answered the door with marks around her left eye, neck and arms, and swelling around her right eye. Police saw Alahverdian begging the woman: "I'm sorry ... can we talk about this?" The woman said that she had argued with Alahverdian, and that he "grabbed her and knocked her to the ground and held her down" when she wanted to leave the flat, and also slapped her face. Police arrested an uncooperative Alahverdian, who proclaimed his innocence and "started hitting his head up against the bars on the back window" of the police cruiser, requiring the police to deploy pepper spray to stop him. As a result of this incident, Alahverdian pleaded no contest to domestic simple assault.

Marital issues 
Having married on November 5, 2010,  Alahverdian’s wife divorced him in May 2011, previously having made a police report stating that although she was divorcing him, and had a restraining order against him, he repeatedly called her. The police concluded that they would initiate an arrest warrant against Alahverdian "for violation of a protection order".

In October 2015, Alahverdian was married for the second time. Seven months later, his second wife moved to divorce him. A court ruled that Alahverdian was "guilty of gross neglect of duty and extreme cruelty" towards his wife. Temporary restraining orders had been put in place against Alahverdian, which the court ruled that he violated by seizing "all of the marital household goods and furnishings from the marital residence". The divorce was made official in 2017, with Alahverdian owing his ex-wife $52,000 he borrowed to purportedly support a community service agency. The Providence Journal reported these events in January 2021.

In February 2022 The Providence Journal further reported that his second wife said she met the "smooth talker" Alahverdian through a singles ward of the Church of Jesus Christ of Latter-day Saints, and that he claimed to be a Mormon. She accused him of becoming "violent" the day after they were married. During their marriage, she said Alahverdian "tried to hurt [her] with a knife", threatened suicide, controlled her appearance, "wanted [her] to stay confined to the house", and cut her off from friends and family. After their divorce,
Alahverdian failed to adhere to the judge's order to pay her over $7,000 in overdue spousal support and legal fees, instead leaving Ohio for Rhode Island.

Fraud investigations and reports 
Shortly before he faked his death in early 2020, Alahverdian was aware that the FBI was investigating him for fraud. His former foster mother, Sharon Lane, alleged that Alahverdian opened 22 credit cards under her husband's name, incurring almost $200,000 in debt.

According to Alahverdian's former lawyer, Jeffrey B. Pine, Alahverdian had moved to Ireland by late 2019, which would hinder any attempt by the FBI to have him arrested as such an arrest would require "international cooperation". However, Alahverdian's actual location was unclear. Alahverdian told The Providence Journal that he and his family had moved to Quebec, Canada. A Rhode Island priest recounted that Alahverdian's purported widow stated Alahverdian had moved to Switzerland. State Rep. Raymond Hull of Rhode Island believed that Alahverdian's purported widow said that Alahverdian had moved to Ireland or Germany.

According to the Sunday Mail, after faking his death, Alahverdian allegedly posed as a marketing expert, in order to defraud Canadian businesswoman Nafsika Antypas of $40,000, by accepting her employment and salary of $100,000 per year, but failing to produce any results. Antypas said she hired Alahverdian (who was posing as Nicholas Knight-Brown) to promote her vegan lifestyle television series, Plant-Based by Nafsika. When Antypas ended their working relationship, Alahverdian allegedly sent her abuse and threats, and posted lies about her online, but eventually ceased contact in June 2020.

Sexual assault investigations
In 2017, Utah investigators began processing a backlog of untested sexual assault kits. In 2018, one of the Utah kits (originally from 2008) was revealed to match Nicholas Alahverdian's DNA from an investigation of the 2008 Ohio sexual assault. A sealed arrest warrant for Rossi/Alahverdian was issued in September 2020.

In 2022 a court document regarding the investigation of Alahverdian, by a Utah law enforcement officer, was released. The document noted police reports against Alahverdian in Massachusetts, Rhode Island, Ohio, and Utah "involving criminal cases of sex assault, harassment, and possible kidnapping from 2007 through 2019."

One report in the document was provided by an ex-girlfriend of Alahverdian. She accused him of inviting her to his home in Orem, Utah in September 2008 on the pretext of repaying the money he owed her. He exposed himself to her, raped her, then accused her of being "mentally unstable and too emotional". After the attack,  he attempted to prevent her from leaving, requiring her to escape when he was distracted. The other cases reported showed a "consistent pattern of behavior" to the above incident, stated the Utah investigator, where Alahverdian was accused of starting "inappropriate contact", then he would "threaten suicide or will force a non-consensual sexual encounter", and later tell police "that the female is the aggressor".

In July 2010, a woman made a police report in Pawtucket, Rhode Island, that Alahverdian brought her to his flat, took her cellphone, stopped her from leaving while threatening suicide, asked her to sit on his lap and kiss him, and only let her go after she screamed at him. Alahverdian later told police that he was "currently being treated for depression", so they sent him to undergo psychological evaluation. In December 2010, a woman made a police report in Pawtucket, Rhode Island, that she had dinner with Alahverdian and then visited his flat, continually rejected his requests for sex, and accused him of stopping her from leaving, forcing her to pay him $200 and to declare on video that she "could not pursue legal action and that the money she gave him was for therapy for him due to her violent actions and her sexual addiction" before she could leave his flat.

On Wednesday July 13, 2022, the Salt Lake County District Attorney's office filed charges against Alahverdian for first degree sexual assault and issued a no-bail warrant for his arrest. The new affidavit alleges that after a fight with the victim in 2008, Alahverdian would not let her leave the bedroom, threw her to the bed and raped her.

Faked death 
In January 2020, Alahverdian reported that he had been diagnosed with non-Hodgkin lymphoma. He provided this information to a number of media organizations. The Providence Journal later stated that Alahverdian "insisted" that they report his illness. A person claiming to be Alahverdian's widow later stated that his illness had lasted for "months", and included "heart disease" and "heart attacks". According to his family and his obituary, Alahverdian succumbed to the disease on February 29, 2020. The person claiming to be his widow said that Alahverdian would be cremated and his remains scattered at sea. She refused to provide copies of Alahverdian's death certificate to The Providence Journal.

Upon Alahverdian's purported death, WPRI reported that he had emigrated from the United States approximately four years earlier. Someone claiming to be his wife attributed this to "security concerns". Alahverdian's purported wife would not publicly reveal her identity or where the family had moved, citing threats.

Authenticity of death questioned
In July 2020, Rhode Island State Police investigated the authenticity of Alahverdian's death; no conclusion had been reached by January 2021. The investigation was triggered by allegations that Alahverdian was still alive, coupled with an outstanding warrant against Alahverdian as he was accused of failing to register as a sex offender in Rhode Island in relation to his 2008 conviction in Ohio.

Alahverdian's former foster mother, Sharon Lane, said that she had been approached by Alahverdian's biological mother in July 2020, who asked her to probe reports of his death. When Lane read the adulatory comments written in his obituary and memorials, she was convinced that the style of writing was Alahverdian's, and thus she concluded that he had faked his death. Alahverdian's former attorney Jeffrey B. Pine also expressed doubts concerning Alahverdian's death as the announcements of his illness and death came shortly after Alahverdian learned of the FBI's investigation against him. Alahverdian's purported widow denied that he had faked his death, stating that he had died in her presence.

In late 2020, the website Wikipediocracy raised issues about the accuracy of the Wikipedia article regarding Alahverdian. Michael Cockram, a Wikipediocracy blog team member, said that multiple Wikipedia accounts created by Alahverdian had edited the Wikipedia page after the date of his purported death, and that one of these accounts had tried to remove the image used to illustrate Alahverdian, replacing it with an image of another person. Cockram, who believed that Alahverdian was still alive, alleged that Alahverdian was now trying to take down the Wikipedia article about him, as well as remove any information that disputed his reported death.

On February 1, 2021, The Providence Journal  published a follow-up to their investigative report of January 27, 2021, stating that they had received a "rambling", "often incoherent" 9-page email from someone stating they were Alahverdian's widow. The email leveled criticisms against several parties, such as the victim of his sexual offense, the police officer who took the sex offense case, the judge who oversaw it and Alahverdian's former foster parents. They also reported that several months after Alahverdian's reported death, Father Bernard Healey, a priest at Our Lady of Mercy Church in East Greenwich, received a request for a funeral mass, from a woman claiming to be Alahverdian's widow. Shortly after arrangements were made, Father Healy was contacted by State Police Detective Conor O'Donnell who requested cancellation of the mass, stating that Alahverdian was alive and had faked his own death and was a fugitive from justice. Father Healy later described the 'woman' he spoke to as sounding like Hyacinth Bucket, with "a very high-pitched English woman's accent"; he was advised by the police that the caller was Alaverdian using a "voice disguiser".

On February 22, 2021, Irish newspaper Sunday World reported they were unable to find a death certificate for anyone under his name in Ireland.

Arrest in Scotland

On December 13, 2021, Alahverdian was arrested at Queen Elizabeth University Hospital, Glasgow, with regard to an alleged rape in Utah in 2008, among other alleged crimes. He was receiving treatment for COVID-19 under the name Arthur Knight. Alahverdian was identified by observation of his tattoos, which matched police records for Rossi. Scarring on one arm suggested Alahverdian had tried to remove one of the tattoos.

On December 23, 2021, he participated in a bail hearing by video link from the hospital, which resulted in him being granted bail. According to prosecutor Jennifer Johnston, the court expected him to remain in the hospital for weeks, but Alahverdian left the hospital the day after he made bail. Johnston also said that Alahverdian attempted to leave the hospital via a private taxi company, and that even before the bail hearing he had "attempted to source a private ambulance and that he tried to source oxygen".

On January 12, 2022, The Providence Journal publicized Alahverdian's arrest, which was confirmed by the Rhode Island State Police. Rhode Island state representative Raymond Hull, who served as a police officer for 34 years, reacted to Alahverdian's arrest by stating: "I've come across a lot of dishonest people in my profession, but I've never come across someone who would fake his own death". Hull additionally lamented how this "set back a bit" efforts to reform the DCYF.

On January 20, 2022, after Alahverdian missed his hearing at the Edinburgh Sheriff Court, he was arrested again in Glasgow, had his bail revoked, and was remanded into custody. The next day, he appeared in court, being addressed as Arthur Knight by his lawyers; he further denied that he was "Nicholas Rossi". He was again granted bail in early February 2022.

In mid-February, Sky News set up a video call between the arrested man and former Rhode Island lawmaker Brian Coogan, who knew Alahverdian for over 20 years. The arrested man claimed not to know Coogan, but Coogan identified the man as Alahverdian, describing that Alahverdian had a scar beside his right eye, which a reporter confirmed the arrested man did have. When Coogan further stated that Alahverdian had tattoos on his biceps of a barcode and a bird wing, the arrested man did not show his biceps, and the video call was ended abruptly.

On April 7, he appeared at the Edinburgh Sheriff Court for a hearing, with his defence lawyer, Anna Kocela, who stated that he had not provided information about the case to her firm, Dunne Defence Lawyers, while he claimed the opposite. The Sheriff told him to return in two weeks after "a discussion with whichever lawyer you wish to instruct", denying the man's repeated requests for an extension. On April 21, the man returned to Edinburgh Sheriff Court, with another lawyer, Becky Houston, and he again denied that he was Nicholas Rossi. The Sheriff  agreed to a request for the full hearing (previously set for May 5) to be delayed and confirmed that a preliminary hearing would be held on May 5 and set the full extradition hearing for June 9, 2022, with the man's bail conditions continuing until then. The man returned to Edinburgh Sheriff Court on May 5. His solicitor's request for another delay to the full extradition hearing was refused by the Sheriff, who said "I am not prepared to discharge the full hearing. The advocate depute and counsel needs to be here to explain why the hearing has been discharged again"; a further preliminary hearing date was set for May 26, 2022.

The June 9 hearing was adjourned because he did not attend court, and instead submitted his doctor's letter which said that he was "mostly bedridden" with an apparent "chronic lung condition". By then, he had separately accused David Leavitt, the American prosecutor attempting to extradite him, of "ritualised child sex abuse".

On June 23, he did not attend an extradition hearing at Edinburgh Sheriff Court because he had been admitted to hospital the previous day. Advocate Depute Paul Harvey told the court that the accused man, who was representing himself in the proceedings, did not attend the Crown Office on June 7 to review all of the Lord Advocate's material that would be submitted to the court to establish his identity. Harvey said that there was “an emerging picture of someone seeking by every means possible to delay these proceedings.”

On June 30, he failed to attend a hearing at the Edinburgh Sheriff Court; his wife had informed the court that he had COVID. The court was told that he had refused to voluntarily give DNA and fingerprints to the police who had attended his home in Glasgow. The Sheriff ordered him to provide the samples and to bring proof of his identity to a court hearing on July 7.

On July 6, Alahverdian was detained in Glasgow for threatening and abusing NHS staff. Prosecutor Julie Clark stated that there was evidence he was in fact fit to go to court and to be detained, despite previous claims that he was medically unfit and unable to do so. He denied the charges when he appeared at Glasgow Sheriff Court on July 7. His application for bail was refused because there was a "substantial risk" that he would abscond or fail to appear in court; he was remanded in custody until his next court appearance. Prosecutor Julie Clark told the court "fingerprints taken when he was arrested for this matter were confirmed to be Nicholas Rossi." Clark also told the court that doctors who have cared for Alahverdian have reported that he has no lung problems, and separately stated that he had faked seizures.

On August 9, Alahverdian was convicted of threatening hospital staff and fined £400. The court heard that hospital staff feared for their safety when Alahverdian jumped out of bed and ran at them, after being told that he was fit to be discharged from hospital; the Sheriff commented that Alahverdian's claims that he could not stand were "not credible".

He appeared at Edinburgh Sheriff Court on August 10, by videolink from HMP Edinburgh; Sheriff Christopher Dickson agreed a request to delay proceedings for the extradition hearing to allow time for his lawyer, Mr Kinloch, to review his case. On September 1, he appeared at Edinburgh Sheriff Court by videolink from prison, when he complained that he was not receiving adequate medical attention. Sheriff Dickson confirmed that an application for bail could be made to the appeal court, and refused defence lawyer David Kinloch's request to delay proceedings to November. On September 15, he appeared again at Edinburgh Sheriff Court by videolink from prison; Sheriff Kenneth Maciver told defence lawyer Ronnie Renucci KC that the man's identity would be the first issue to be addressed at the full extradition hearing, and that it would not be difficult to resolve.

On November 11, 2022, Sheriff Norman McFadyen of Edinburgh Sheriff Court ruled using the standard of the balance of probabilities that the arrested man's identity is Nicholas Rossi, basing his ruling on fingerprint, tattoo and photographic evidence. An extradition hearing has been arranged for March 2023.

On November 28, 2022 Essex Police in England confirmed Rossi is under investigation for an alleged rape there, which would likely delay any extradition to the United States should this result in charges. On January 5, 2023 his application to be released on bail was refused. He claimed he was being "taunted" by remand prisoners at HM Prison Edinburgh singing John Denver’s song "Leaving on a Jet Plane" to him.

In a podcast published in February 2023, British journalist Jane MacSorley has alleged that Alahverdian's wife Miranda Louisa Knight pretended to be his widow 'Louise' and helped spread the fake news of his death; during an interview, Miranda initially said that the allegation was "laughable", but then did not respond once audio comparisons of the voices of Miranda and 'Louise' were played. Dr Frederika Holmes, a voice-recognition expert, listened to recordings of Miranda and 'Louise', and concluded: "I do think it’s the same speaker", with 'Louise' having a Bristol accent, Miranda being from Bristol, and the implausibility of technology being able to add such an accent.

See also
List of fugitives from justice who disappeared

References 

1987 births
Fugitives wanted by the United States
Living people
People who faked their own death
American people convicted of indecent assault
Conflict-of-interest editing on Wikipedia